Leucogramma is a genus of moths of the family Noctuidae. The genus was erected by George Hampson in 1926.

Species
Leucogramma hypenoides Schaus, 1906
Leucogramma niveilinea Schaus, 1894

References

Catocalinae